Slow Buildings is the third and final studio album from Pale Saints, released by 4AD on 29 August 1994.<ref name="Discogs.com">[http://www.discogs.com/Pale-Saints-Slow-Buildings/release/4231859 Pale Saints on Discogs.com]</ref> This was the band's first album following the departure of original singer and bassist Ian Masters and addition of Colleen Browne on bass/vocals; guitarist Meriel Barham, who had joined Pale Saints for their previous album In Ribbons, also took over lead vocal duties. Slow Buildings'' features the single "Fine Friend" (which was adapted, with new lyrics, from the 1981 song "Poison in the Airwaves" by Scottish band Persian Rugs ). "Henry", "One Blue Hill", and "Angel (Will You Be My)", were released as radio singles only.

Track listing

Singles
"Fine Friend" (BAD4013, 15 August 1994)
"Fine Friend" – 4:03
"Special Present" – 4:07
"Marimba" – 6:46
"Reprise" ("Fine Friend") – 1:54

Personnel
Pale Saints
Colleen Browne – bass, vocals
Chris Cooper – drums, percussion
Graeme Naysmith – guitar
Meriel Barham – guitar, vocals

Additional musicians
Caroline Lavelle – cello
Simon Clarke – flute
Roddy Lorimer – trumpet

References

1994 albums
4AD albums
Albums produced by Hugh Jones (producer)
Pale Saints albums